The 2nd Annual Interactive Achievement Awards is the 2nd edition of the Interactive Achievement Awards, an annual awards event that honors the best games in the video game industry. The awards are arranged by the Academy of Interactive Arts & Sciences (AIAS), and were held at the Hard Rock Hotel and Casino in Las Vegas, Nevada on  during E3 1999. There was not an official host of the award ceremony, but featured a wide variety of presenters, including Sugar Ray Leonard, Bruno Campos, Kelly Hu, Zachery Ty Bryan, Ben Stein, David Gallagher, Coolio, Danica McKellar, Nicholle Tom and Chris Roberts.

The Legend of Zelda: Ocarina of Time and Half-Life were tied with the most nominations. The Legend of Zelda: Ocarina of Time also won the most awards including Game of the Year. Electronic Arts received the most nominations while Nintendo won the most awards both as a developer and a publisher. There was also a tie between finalists for Computer Creativity Title of the Year and Online Family/Board Game of the Year.

Sid Meier was also the received the of the Academy of Interactive Arts & Sciences Hall of Fame Award.

Winners and Nominees
Winners are listed first, highlighted in boldface, and indicated with a double dagger.

Hall of Fame Award
 Sid Meier

Games with multiple nominations and awards
Any game that was nominated for a console genre award was also a nominee for Console Game of the Year. The same can be applied to nominees for computer awards and Computer Game of the Year.

Companies with multiple nominations

Companies that received multiple nominations as either a developer or a publisher.

Companies that received multiple awards as either a developer or a publisher.

External links
 Original Archived Finalists Navigation Page

Notes

References

Annual Interactive Achievement Awards
Annual Interactive Achievement Awards
Annual Interactive Achievement Awards
Annual Interactive Achievement Awards
1998 in video gaming
1999 in video gaming
D.I.C.E. Award ceremonies